This is a list of films produced by the Bollywood film industry based in Mumbai in 1975:

Top-grossing films
The top ten grossing films at the Indian Box Office in 
1975:

A-Z

References

External links 
 Bollywood films of 1975 at the Internet Movie Database

1975
Bollywood
Films, Bollywood